Juhi Aslam is an Indian television actress known for her role Bharti Chauhan in Television series Baba Aiso Varr Dhoondo. For this role she won Indian Television Academy Awards Award For Gr8! Face Female 2011.

Personal life 
Aslam was born in Uttar Pradesh. Her height is 4'1". She aspired to be a doctor.
Talking about her height in an interview to Times of India she said: “My height is my biggest strength.”
Her first show Baba Aiso Varr Dhoondo is about the life of people with dwarfism.

In 2018 she married Karim and had a son named Mohammed Rahim.

Television

References

External links

1988 births
21st-century Indian actresses
Living people
Actresses in Hindi television
Actresses from Uttar Pradesh
Actors with dwarfism